Audrey Schulman is an American author of literary and speculative fiction.

Career 
Schulman's debut novel The Cage, about a wildlife photographer who goes on an expedition to photograph the final polar bears before they went extinct due to global warming, was published in 1994. The novel was inspired by Schulman's personal fears about climate change and the impact of global warming on the environment. She published her sophomore novel Swimming with Jonah in 1999. The novel received mixed reviews from critics, including a starred review in Publishers Weekly. This was followed by A House Named Brazil(2000) which received mixed to positive reviews.

In 2012, Schulman ended an eleven-year hiatus by publishing Three Weeks in December. In 2018, she published the science fiction novel Theory of Bastards.

She published The Dolphin House, about a young woman who develops a close bond with the dolphins at a research institute in St. Thomas. It is based on real events.

Personal life 
Schulman resides in Cambridge, Massachusetts.

Awards and nominations

Works 

 The Cage (1994)
 Swimming with Jonah (1999)
 A House Named Brazil (2000)
 Three Weeks in December (2012)
 Theory of Bastards (2018)
 The Dolphin House (2022)

References

External links 
https://audreyschulman.com/

Living people
21st-century American women writers
Women science fiction and fantasy writers
American women novelists